The Souk Sharq is a major shopping center in Kuwait City, Kuwait. The center began as a traditional souq but as the city has undergone investment it has expanded into a modernized shopping mall of approximately  area.

Overview
On its two floors, there is a wide variety of retail outlets and many well-known high-street shops such as Britain's Debenham's, River Island, Next, GNC, Boots, Mothercare, Zara and The Body Shop. It also contains designer Charles Jourdan, Nokia and Sony. There are numerous cafes and restaurants.

The water-clock on the ground floor is a  structure, constructed by Professor Bernard Gitton.

On 29 March 2003, the government of Kuwait announced an Iraqi rocket had hit the complex  causing fatal damages but no casualties.

References

Buildings and structures in Kuwait City
Retail markets in Kuwait
1998 establishments in Kuwait
Shopping malls established in 1998
Shopping malls in Kuwait